The Pakistani cricket team toured England in the 1992 English cricket season, the first tour since the acrimonious visit by England to Pakistan in 1987/88, which was highlighted by the Mike Gatting/Shakoor Rana dispute. Five Test matches and five One Day Internationals were scheduled, running from May to August.

The Test series was won 2–1 by Pakistan, who fielded a consistently strong team led by Javed Miandad and featuring the batting talent of Saleem Malik and the strike bowling partnership of Wasim Akram and Waqar Younis as well as the guile of Leg-spinner Mushtaq Ahmed. England's batting was also strong, with Alec Stewart, Graham Gooch and Robin Smith excelling, but they lacked a consistent bowling threat.

The Pakistani opening bowlers developed prodigious Reverse swing with the old ball, and ripped through the England tail on numerous occasions. Although the quality of those batsmen could certainly be called into question, the ease with which Wasim and Waqar dismissed the lower order was a significant and series-winning difference for Pakistan.

Tension between the teams bubbled beneath the surface throughout the tour. In the third test, Aaqib Javed was warned by the umpires for intimidatory bowling at Devon Malcolm, which riled up the Pakistan team. Accusations of ball tampering to produce their reverse swing were levied at Wasim and Waqar through the British press, after they were reported to the ICC Match Referee after a One-day International at Lord's. The accusations led to a high-level inquiry, but ultimately no players had action taken against them and the furore eventually died away.

England won the One-day International series 4–1, with Stewart, Smith, Graeme Hick and Neil Fairbrother leading the batting.

Squads

Test series

1st Test

Play was only possible from the end of the second scheduled day, and both teams made heavy weather of bowling their opponents out. Big centuries from Miandad and Malik put the tourists in a commanding position, but they were stymied by only having a day and a half to bowl England out twice, and once Stewart had settled into his innings the draw was the only likely outcome.

DeFreitas, Lewis and Pringle shouldered the bulk of the bowling for England, but only the former enjoyed any success, his four wickets reward for perseverance. For the Pakistanis, Mushtaq Ahmed bowled 50 overs for just two wickets, and Ata-ur-Rehman, on debut, seemed under-used in hindsight, bowling just 18 overs in the innings.

This match is also notable for the debut of Inzamam-ul-Haq, who made 8 not out.

2nd Test

After winning the toss and electing to bat, England initially looked to be in a promising position as Gooch and Stewart put on 123 for the first wicket. This turned out to be the biggest partnership of the match though, as from that point on, wickets fell at regular intervals. Waqar Younis ripped the heart out of the England middle order, removing Lamb, Botham and Lewis on the way to figures of 5–91. Pakistan's reply featured half-centuries from Aamir Sohail, Asif Mujtaba and Salim Malik, but they could only establish a first innings lead of 38, Malcolm and DeFreitas the pick of England's bowlers.

Second time around, only Stewart (69*) could muster any resistance, with Extras contributing the next highest score (28) in a total of 175. Wasim Akram's 4–66 was earned mostly at the expense of England's tail. Pakistan made their target of 138 look like hard work, falling to 18–3 and 95–8 with Lewis (3–43) and Ian Salisbury (3–49) their main tormentors. Once again, Wasim and Waqar combined to win the match – only this time with the bat. A dogged 45 not out from Wasim and strong support from Waqar (20*) saw Pakistan home.

Ian Salisbury's maiden Test innings ended Hit wicket. He also acted as Nightwatchman in the second innings.

3rd Test

With Pakistan already in a commanding position (388/3), no play was possible on the second day, making the chance of a result much less likely. Both sides attacked the bowling with relish, and Aamir Sohail's 205 was his first Test century in only his third match. Ramiz Raja, Asif Mujtaba and Javed Miandad all made half centuries as well, and only Gooch was able to stem the flow of runs, his 18 overs going for just 39.

England's reply was rather stop-start. Although Gooch, Gower, and Lewis all made half-centuries, none went on to make a really big score, and England looked in trouble at various points of in innings being 42/2, 200/5 and 256/7, before Salisbury and the debuting Tim Munton added 64 for the ninth wicket. Pakistan's pace trio of Wasim, Waqar and Aaqib Javed did the bulk of the bowling.

The final day saw Ramiz make another half-century, but the game petered out into a draw.

4th Test

The overcast sky and seaming pitch made the selection of England's nearly-man Neil Mallender for his debut look inspired. England's all-seam attack rattled through the Pakistani batting, with only Salim Malik putting up any resistance, though he ended up stranded on 82 despite useful support from Mushtaq Ahmed that spared the tourists' blushes (they added 64 for the ninth wicket).

Gooch (135) and Atherton (76) put the lie to any demons in the pitch though, with an opening stand of 168, and with Robin Smith (42) adding another century with Gooch for the second wicket, it looked like a walkover. Waqar decimated the lower order though, picking up five wickets as England slumped from 292/2 to 320 all out.

In the second innings, Ramiz blasted 63 as wickets fell around to leave Pakistan 96/4, and again Malik was the mainstay of the innings, making 84 before running out of partners for the second time. The England batsmen made rather hard work of their target of 99, Atherton, Smith and Stewart all falling in single figures, but Gooch and then Gower saw them to victory.

5th Test

England won the toss and batted, and the upper order all made starts, but only Atherton converted that into a half-century, and from the relative security of 182/3, Wasim (6–67) and Aaqib (2–44) worked their magic as the middle order and tail again had no answer to the Pakistani pacemen. In reply, four Pakistanis made fifties, including wicketkeeper Rashid Latif on his debut, but none of them made the huge score they'd threatened. Malcolm picked up five wickets.

England's second innings was anchored by Smith (84*), but around him the batting failed, collapsing to 59/4 before Smith, Ramprakash and Lewis steadied the innings, but eventually only able to muster 174. Waqar (5–52) was the principle destroyer, picking up the first four wickets and finishing it off by bowling Malcolm, and Wasim (3–36) again picked up the tail with little trouble. Sohail knocked off the runs from Ramprakash's first legitimate delivery.

ODI series

1st ODI

2nd ODI

3rd ODI

4th ODI

5th ODI

Notes

References
 Playfair Cricket Annual 1993
 Wisden Cricketers' Almanack 1993

1992 in English cricket
1992
International cricket competitions from 1991–92 to 1994